Charles-Joseph Marie Pitard, name sometimes given as Charles-Joseph Marie Pitard-Briau (30 October 1873 – 29 December 1927) was a French pharmacist and botanist.

In 1899 he obtained his doctorate in natural sciences at the University of Bordeaux, later serving as a professor at the school of medicine in Tours. He conducted botanical and exploratory investigations in the Canary Islands (1904–06), Tunisia (1907–10 & 1913) and Morocco (1911–13). Many of his plant collections were sent to herbaria in Geneva and Paris.

He was the taxonomic authority of numerous botanical taxa. About 525 names have been published. Such as Aichryson mollii Pit., Iles Canaries 189.

The genus Pitardia (Batt. ex Pit.), now classed as a synonym of Nepeta , was named in his honor. Then in 2003, Tirveng. published Pitardella, a genus of flowering plants from Indo-China, belonging to the family Rubiaceae.

Also named in his honour, are plants with the specific epithets of pitardii (about 27) and pitardiana (about 7). Such as Beaumontia pitardii , and also Poa pitardiana .

Published works 
 Les Iles Canaries. Flore de l'Archipel (1908) – The Canary Islands, flora of the archipelago (with Louis Proust, 1878–1959).
 Contribution à l'étude de la Flore du Maroc (1931) – Contribution to the study of Moroccan flora.
Pitard also made significant contributions to the "Flore générale de L'Indo-Chine" (General flora of Indochina).

References 

1872 births
1928 deaths
20th-century French botanists
French pharmacists
University of Bordeaux alumni
19th-century French botanists